Eve Düşen Yıldırım, is a Turkish romantic drama television series. It is adaptation of Nahit Sırrı Örik's 1936 novel of same name. The series originally aired from March 9, 2012 to October 15, 2012. It ran for two seasons on Show TV.

Cast 
 Murat Han (Namık)
 Gizem Karaca (Muazzez)
 Seda Akman (Şayeste)
 Mehmetcan Minciözlü (Sait)
 Şencan Güleryüz (Halil)
 Suzan Aksoy (Perihan)
 Buket Dereoğlu (Pınar)
 Nazan Diper (Emine)

International broadcasts

References

External links

2012 Turkish television series debuts
2012 Turkish television series endings
Turkish drama television series
Television series by Med Yapım
Show TV original programming
Television shows set in Istanbul
Television series produced in Istanbul
Television series set in the 2010s